Bukovany may refer to places in the Czech Republic:

Bukovany (Benešov District), a municipality and village in the Central Bohemian Region
Bukovany (Hodonín District), a municipality and village in the South Moravian Region
Bukovany (Olomouc District), a municipality and village in the Olomouc Region
Bukovany (Příbram District), a municipality and village in the Central Bohemian Region
Bukovany (Sokolov District), a municipality and village in the Karlovy Vary Region